Caribou is the second largest city in Aroostook County, Maine, United States. Its population was 7,396 at the 2020 census, and between the 2010 and 2020 census it was the fastest-shrinking city in Maine. The city is a service center for the agricultural and tourism industries, and the location of a National Weather Service Forecast Office.

History

Lumbermen and trappers first set up camps in the area in the 1810s.  The first settlers came to what is now Caribou in the 1820s.  Between 1838 and 1840, the undeclared Aroostook War flared between the United States and Canada, and the Battle of Caribou occurred in December 1838. The dispute over the international boundary delayed settlement of the area until after the signing of the Webster-Ashburton Treaty in 1842. With peace restored, European settlers arrived in gradually-increasing numbers beginning in 1843. From Eaton Plantation and part of half-township H, Caribou was incorporated in 1859 as the town of Lyndon on April 5. In 1869, it annexed Eaton, Sheridan and Forestville plantations. On February 26 of that year its name was changed to Caribou, only to revert to Lyndon on March 9. On February 8, 1877, Caribou was finally confirmed as the town's permanent name. Two enduring mysteries are the reason for the original name of Lyndon, and the reasons for the town's name being subsequently changed back and forth between Lyndon and Caribou.  Caribou was the "jumping off" point for a large influx of settlers who immigrated directly from Sweden in 1870–1871, and settled the nearby "Swedish colony."  The small town grew throughout the late 19th century, and with the coming of the Bangor and Aroostook Railroad in the 1890s, agricultural exports exploded.  This began a boom period which lasted well into the 1960s.  Caribou became the largest potato shipping hub in the world, and had many related industries.

Nearby to the northeast, Loring Air Force Base opened in the early 1950s near Limestone, with bomber and tanker aircraft of the Strategic Air Command. It provided a major economic boost to the area, with construction starting in 1947 on "Limestone Army Air Field." Caribou was incorporated as a city in 1967 on February 23, but the area's boom period leveled off in the 1970s as a result of difficulties in its traditional potato industry.  That, along with closure of the base in 1994, contributed to a decline in population in the 1980s and 1990s.

In September 1984, Caribou was the lift-off location of the first successful solo balloon crossing of the Atlantic Ocean by Colonel Joseph Kittinger.  This flight is memorialized at the Rosie O'Grady Balloon of Peace Park one mile (1.6 km) south of the city on Main Street.  This site includes a large replica of Kittinger's balloon.

The Caribou Public Library is a Carnegie library. Designed in the Romanesque Revival style by local architect Schuyler C. Page, it was built in 1911–1912 with a $10,000 grant.

Geography
Caribou is located on the northern bend of the Aroostook River before it heads southeast to join the Saint John River just east of Fort Fairfield, Maine.

The county is readily accessible by two major highways; Interstate 95 from the south and the Trans-Canada Highway (New Brunswick Route 2) from the north and east. In sparsely populated Aroostook County, Caribou is at the hub of spokes serving the area via U.S. 1 and Maine State routes 89, 161, 164, 205 and 228. In 2013, a bypass was completed just outside the urban limits.

Caribou has a municipal airport, with full east–west and north–south runways. It is primarily used for corporate, hobby, and Civil Air Patrol usage. Northern Maine Regional Airport in Presque Isle serves as the primary hub for air service. Daily flights are scheduled to and from northern Maine on United Airlines with connections to Newark Liberty International Airport.

Seaports are also close by in coastal Maine, New Brunswick, and Quebec.

The Eastern Maine Railroad serves Caribou and Aroostook County, also connecting Maine, Vermont and the Canadian provinces of Quebec and New Brunswick and providing a direct rail link between northern Maine; Saint John, New Brunswick; and Montreal, Quebec. Given the city's economic and cultural ties with the Canadian provinces of Quebec and New Brunswick, cross-border partnerships and relationships are often a common facet in many businesses.

Climate

Caribou has a humid continental climate (Köppen Dfb), with very cold, snowy winters, and mild to warm summers, and is located in USDA hardiness zone 4b/4a. Although 1991–2020 averaged 2 days annually with highs at or above , more than 35 percent of all years on record have not seen such temperatures. Precipitation is substantial year-round, with a slight summer maximum, and with fall being wetter than spring. On average, the driest month is February, and the wettest month is July.

The average first freeze of the season occurs on September 23, and the last May 15, resulting in a freeze-free season of 130 days; the corresponding dates for measurable snowfall, i.e. at least , are October 23 and April 25. Measurable snowfalls typically occur from early November to early April. A snow depth of at least  is on average seen 78 days per winter, including 63 days from January to March, when the snow pack is typically most reliable.

Demographics

2010 census
As of the census of 2010, there were 8,189 people, 3,559 households, and 2,206 families residing in the city. The racial makeup of the city was 98.2% White, 0.0% African American, 1.4% Native American, 0.7% Asian, 0.2% from other races, and 0.2% from two or more races. Hispanic or Latino of any race were 0.01% of the population.

There were 3,559 households, of which 27.5% had children under the age of 18 living with them, 46.5% were married couples living together, 11.4% had a female householder with no husband present, 4.0% had a male householder with no wife present, and 38.0% were non-families. 32.0% of all households were made up of individuals, and 13.8% had someone living alone who was 65 years of age or older. The average household size was 2.26 and the average family size was 2.82.

The median age in the city was 44 years. 21.2% of residents were under the age of 18; 7.1% were between the ages of 18 and 24; 23.2% were from 25 to 44; 29.3% were from 45 to 64; and 19.3% were 65 years of age or older. The gender makeup of the city was 48.0% male and 52.0% female.

2000 census
As of the census of 2000, there were 8,312 people, 3,517 households, and 2,324 families residing in the city. The racial makeup of the city was 99.22% White, 0.01% African American, 1.48% Native American, 0.91% Asian, 0.07% Pacific Islander, 0.08% from other races, and 0.0% from two or more races. Hispanic or Latino of any race were 0.46% of the population.

There were 3,517 households, out of which 27.7% had children under the age of 18 living with them, 52.9% were married couples living together, 9.7% had a female householder with no husband present, and 33.9% were non-families. 28.7% of all households were made up of individuals, and 13.1% had someone living alone who was 65 years of age or older. The average household size was 2.32 and the average family size was 2.84.

In the city, the population was spread out, with 22.5% under the age of 18, 6.6% from 18 to 24, 27.3% from 25 to 44, 26.2% from 45 to 64, and 17.6% who were 65 years of age or older. The median age was 41 years. For every 100 females, there were 93.2 males. For every 100 females age 18 and over, there were 88.8 males.

The median income for a household in the city was $29,485, and the median income for a family was $38,378. Males had a median income of $29,202 versus $20,737 for females. The per capita income for the city was $16,061. About 8.4% of families and 12.4% of the population were below the poverty line, including 13.7% of those under age 18 and 11.9% of those age 65 or over.

Public safety
Caribou's Public Safety is served 24/7/365 by the Caribou Fire and Ambulance Department, and the Caribou Police Department.

Caribou Fire and Ambulance Department is a combination full-time, paid call and volunteer fire department. Caribou Fire and Ambulance Department apparatuses include First Out Engine 1, two pumper tankers (Tanker 2 and Tanker 4), Ladder 3, Rescue 6, Utility Pickup 7, Incident Command 5, one snowmobile, one ATV (used by both police and fire), five ambulances, two fixed-wing aircraft (courtesy of FreshAir, Inc).

Caribou Fire and Ambulance Department is staffed by 15 Full-Time Firefighter/Paramedics, one Full-Time Chief and approx. 30 Paid Call / Volunteer Firefighter/EMT/Paramedics.
Full-Time personnel work a 24 on and 48 off schedule. Each shift is covered by one Captain and 4 firefighter/paramedics.

Services provided are Fire prevention, suppression, medical emergency response, Critical Care Air and Ground transfers, Local and Long Distant transfers from one health care facility to another, high angle and low angle rescues, HAZ-MAT, vehicle extrication, and health education.

Education

 Caribou Community School – Prekindergarten through 8th grade.
 Caribou High School
 Loring Job Corps, a federal vocational and technical school located four miles northeast of Caribou at the Loring Commerce Center.

Industry

In Caribou and throughout Aroostook County, the two major agricultural crops are potatoes at one point peas and broccoli. The chief varieties are Russet Burbank, Superior, Shepody and Atlantic. Aroostook County is renowned for its round white potatoes. The potato crop is used for seed, table stock, and processed potato products. Aroostook County is the largest grower of broccoli on the East Coast.

Other important agricultural crops grown in Caribou include blueberries, hay, oats, and alternative crops on a smaller scale. Cattle and dairy farming are a growing segment of the agricultural landscape. The high volume of activity results in the growth of related agri-business. Farm implement sales and services and the development of several area processing plants are examples of the influence agriculture has on the local economy.

Other employers include light manufacturers, information technology companies, and the woods products industry.  The Loring Commerce Center is located four miles from Caribou and has several major employers, including the Maine Military Authority (100 employees) which restores military and municipal heavy equipment, the Defense Finance Accounting Service (600 employees) which handles accounting and payroll for the armed services, and Job Corps (200 employees).  Caribou is also, along with neighboring Presque Isle,  one of the service hubs for central Aroostook County.

Media
Caribou is served by WAGM-TV, a CBS affiliate located in Presque Isle, which is the only full-power commercial television station north of Bangor. Residents of Caribou receive the Maine Public Broadcasting Network, a PBS affiliate, over WMEM-TV, as well as the CBC from Canada. Most residents subscribe to Dish Network, DIRECTV or Spectrum. The city is also home to two radio stations: WCXU 97.7 FM, and WFST 600 AM, a Christian station. In addition, listeners can receive other radio stations in northern Maine, Western New Brunswick and Eastern Quebec. They include CJEM 92.7 FM, CIKX 93.5 FM, CBAL-FM-5 94.3 FM, WQHR 96.1 FM, WBPW 96.9 FM, CBAM 99.5 FM, CBAF 100.3 FM, CFAI-1 101.1 FM, WOZI 101.9 FM, CBZC 103.3 FM, CFAI-1 105.1 FM, WMEM 106.1 FM, CIBM 107.1 FM and WEGP 1390 AM. Home delivery of the daily newspaper out of Bangor, the Bangor Daily News, is also available.

Arts and culture

The Caribou Performing Arts Center draws acts and shows from all over the United States and Canada. Caribou also has a music program centered around the Caribou Music Department. Music education has been a vital part of the education system in Caribou for years.

Caribou is also home to Echoes magazine, a quarterly publication about rural culture and heritage focused primarily on northern Maine.  It recently marked its 20th anniversary, and is read throughout the United States.  In addition, the Caribou Choral Society has performed concerts in Aroostook County for the last 35 years, and consists of performers from throughout the northern Maine/western New Brunswick region.

Recreation
Caribou has over a dozen cross-country ski trails with varied scenery and terrain within a one-hour drive of the city.  It has two municipal cross-country ski venues; one within the urban limits which has lights for night skiing as well as a visitors center, and a lengthier venue two miles (3 km) outside the urban limits.  Both are consistently well-groomed for skate and classical skiing, and accept donations for usage.  The Maine Winter Sports Center is headquartered in Caribou. It is the premier outdoor sports organization in the state.  MWSC is active in Caribou's recreational life during all four seasons and sponsors numerous events, including a Ski Dash, Youth Ski Festival, and the Caribou Mile road race.
Aroostook County is widely known by sports enthusiasts for its well-groomed extensive snowmobile trail system; Caribou maintains  of Aroostook County's  snowmobile trail system. Snowmobilers can venture out every day, choose a variety of routes and with the number of loop trails never cross the same trail twice. Many county communities are located on the Canada–US border, making international travel by snowmobile convenient. Running through the heart of Aroostook County is the Northeast Snowmobile Trail (NEST), and International Snowmobile Trail System linking Maine, New Hampshire, Vermont, and the Province of Quebec.

In 2008, the city finished construction on a large, multi-use recreation, wellness, and community center, which was attached to the existing recreation center.  This project is designed to also include a large indoor swimming pool and a fitness center.  The construction is being completed in phases.

Other recreational options include a 9-hole golf course, multi-use hiking/biking/ATV trails, a four screen movie theater, a frisbee golf course, a roller skating rink, Spud Speedway (the area's only race track), a bowling alley, The Maine Dance Academy, and several excellent parks. Goughan's Berry Farm includes miniature golf, a petting zoo, a carousel, ice cream, and a corn maze in the fall.  The community completed construction of a new outdoor tennis complex in 2009, to complement the existing courts at Teague Park.

Sites of interest

 Caribou Historical Society & Museum
 Caribou Performing Arts Center
 Nylander Museum – Northern Maine's Natural History Museum
 Gray Memorial United Methodist Church and Parsonage
 McElwain House

Notable people

 Donald Collins, four-term state senator
 Patricia M. Collins, two-term mayor of Caribou and civic leader
 Samuel Collins, State Senator and Supreme Judicial Court Justice
 Susan Collins, U.S. senator
 Peter Edgecomb, Maine state senator
 Roland Gammon, writer
 Wallace Hardison, Union Oil co-founder
 Leo Kieffer, mayor of Caribou, Maine state senator
 Paryse Martin, artist
 Jessica Meir, NASA astronaut
Florence Collins Porter, suffragist, clubwoman, Republican campaigner
 Max Whittier, California oil mogul

References

External links

 City of Caribou, Maine
 Caribou Public Library
 Caribou Chamber of Commerce & Industry
 Map of Caribou, Maine, ca. 1870, from the Maine Memory Network

 
Populated places established in 1859
Cities in Maine
Cities in Aroostook County, Maine
1859 establishments in Maine